Homeobox protein Hox-C11 is a protein that in humans is encoded by the HOXC11 gene.

This gene belongs to the homeobox family of genes. The homeobox genes encode a highly conserved family of transcription factors that play an important role in morphogenesis in all multicellular organisms. 

Mammals possess four similar homeobox gene clusters, HOXA, HOXB, HOXC and HOXD, which are located on different chromosomes and consist of 9 to 11 genes arranged in tandem. This gene is one of several homeobox HOXC genes located in a cluster on chromosome 12. The product of this gene binds to a promoter element of the lactase-phlorizin hydrolase. It also may play a role in early intestinal development. An alternatively spliced variant encoding a shorter isoform has been described but its full-length nature has not been determined.

References

Further reading

External links 
 

Transcription factors